The Directorate of Criminal Investigations(DCI),  previously referred to as Criminal Investigation Department(CID) is a department of the National Police Service mainly responsible for investigation. The current Director is Mr. Mohamed Ibrahim Amin  The Director reports to the Inspector General of Police. Due to the sensitivity of the position, the Director of the DCI is appointed by the President of Kenya . The DCI headquarters are located on Kiambu Road, Nairobi. The Directorate of Criminal Investigations derives her mandate from Article 247 of the Constitution of Kenya and through the National Police Service Act 2011 which establishes the Directorate as an organ of the National Police Service (NPS)

This Department is further divided into sub-departments, namely:

Directorates at Headquarters

Administration Directorate
Operations Directorate
Investigation Directorate
Forensic Directorate
Crime Research Intelligence Bureau
National Central Bureau
Counter Terrorism Centre of Excellence

Criminal Intelligence Unit (CIU)
Public Complaints Department 
Inspections Department 
Logistics Department 
Reforms Department 
Legal & Crime Affairs Department 
Motor Vehicle Verifications Department
Disbanded sub-branches
Special Service Unit (SSU)
Flying squad

Formations

Anti Terrorist Police Unit (ATPU)
Sting Squad Headquarters (SSH)
Kenya Airports Police Unit (KAPU)
Kenya Railways Police Unit (KRPU)
DCI Academy

Regional and County Command Level

DCI command spreads out from the Headquarters to regions, counties, sub-counties, and DCI offices in their service provision. At the regional level, there are Regional Criminal Investigations Officers (RCIOs) who are directly responsible to the Director for the effective administration of their respective regions.

In every county, the DCI is headed by a County Criminal Investigation Officer (CCIO) who reports to the RCIOs. Under CCIOs are the Sub-County Criminal Investigation Officers (SCCIOs) and Officers in-charge of Sub-offices in crime-prone areas.

There are 8 regional, 47 County Directorate Offices and 3 Formations (ATPU, KAPU, DCI Academy & KRPU) and over 297 Sub-counties countrywide. The RCIOs who  replaced the former Provincial Criminal Investigations Officers (PCIOs) manage  counties within their regions and report to the Director on all matters affecting the Directorate.

Functions of DCI

 To collect and provide criminal intelligence;
 To undertake investigations on serious crimes including homicide, narcotics crimes, human trafficking, money laundering, terrorism, economic crimes, piracy, organized crimes, and cybercrime, among others;
 To maintain law and order;
 To detect and prevent crimes;
 To apprehend offenders;
 To maintain criminal records;
 To conduct forensic analysis.
 To execute the directions given to the Inspector-General by the Director of Public Prosecutions pursuant to Article 157 (4) of the Kenyan constitution.
 To investigate any matter that may be referred to it by the Independent Police Oversight Authority (IPOA)

Completion of Forensic Science Laboratory

Kenya's DCI is tasked primarily with intelligence gathering and evidence collection where crimes of a complex nature have occurred. The accomplishment of the above received a major boost following the completion of the police forensic laboratory.

The over Ksh 5.7B forensic lab is fully equipped ,staffed and is located at its headquarters at Mazingira House, Kiambu Road.

The Biological, Chemistry, Toxicological and DNA laboratories are housed in the National Police Service Forensic Laboratory. Detectives have embraced science to solve complex crimes. Detectives are now able to analyze samples collected from the scenes of serious crimes such as murders, attempted murders, hijackings, house robberies, and possession of illegal firearms, a departure from the past.

Directors of Criminal Investigations

See also
 National Intelligence Service
 Military Intelligence

References

Law enforcement in Kenya
Criminal investigation